Khatoon Bibi is a Pakistani woman politician hailing from Gharib Abad, Gohati, Swabi District, belong to Pakistan Tehreek-e-Insaf. Who is currently serving as Member of the Khyber Pakhtunkhwa Assembly. She is also serving as Parliamentary Secretary in Health Department.

Political career
Khatoon Bibi was elected as the member of the Khyber Pakhtunkhwa Assembly on ticket of Awami Jamhuri Ittehad Pakistan (later merged to Pakistan Tehreek-e-Insaf) from Constituency WR-21 in 2013 Pakistani general election on women reserved seat.

References

Living people
Year of birth missing (living people)
Pashtun people
Khyber Pakhtunkhwa MPAs 2013–2018
Women members of the Provincial Assembly of Khyber Pakhtunkhwa
People from Swabi District
Pakistan Tehreek-e-Insaf politicians
21st-century Pakistani women politicians